Michael Riedel (born December 24, 1966) is an American theatre critic, conservative broadcaster, and columnist. He is the co-host of "Len Berman and Michael Riedel in the Morning" on 710 WOR in New York City, weekdays 6-10am.  Riedel has been a controversial and influential Broadway columnist of the New York Post for over 20 years. Riedel's book Razzle Dazzle: The Battle for Broadway won the 2015 Marfield Prize for arts writing and is widely considered to be the successor to The Season, William Goldman's classic 1967 book about Broadway. His second book, Singular Sensation: The Triumph of Broadway, was published by Avid Reader Press, a division of Simon & Schuster, on November 10, 2020.

Riedel's skewering of Broadway shows and personalities in his column have made him a controversial and often feared figure on the New York theater scene. He has been called "the terrible infant of the New York press".

Early life and education
Riedel was born on December 24, 1966, and grew up in Geneseo, New York. His father was the athletic director for SUNY Geneseo and his mother was a grade-school librarian. He has been described as a "smart, sarcastic kid" who joined the Young Republicans at 12 and originally planned to become a lawyer and politician.

He initially enrolled at Johns Hopkins University, but transferred after a year to Columbia University. While at Columbia, he acted in plays and regularly appeared on a radio show devoted to musical theater. The summer after his sophomore year, he interned for Liz McCann while she was producing the Broadway production of Les liaisons dangereuses. In 1989, he graduated magna cum laude and Phi Beta Kappa with a BA in History.

Career
After graduating from Columbia, Riedel served as Managing Editor of the now-defunct TheaterWeek magazine, which he attempted to make more literary by hiring highly respected theater figures such as critic Eric Bentley to write articles. He stayed friends with Bentley until the latter's death in 2020.

In 1993, he was hired as a gossip columnist for The Daily News and subsequently launched his now-famous column reporting the latest news and speculation about the Broadway theater scene. In 1998, he moved his column to the New York Post, where he remains today. In September 2015, the Post announced that it was cutting the column from two columns a week to one. Riedel said of the change: "I'm happy about the changes. It's all part of a redesign of the features pages. If there's any 'breaking news,' I'll get it on the website and in the paper the next day." Riedel's Wednesday column was reinstated in the paper in 2016 after advertisers complained of its absence.

David Leveaux controversy
In 2005, Riedel was the subject of considerable press himself when he was in an altercation with English director David Leveaux at the Manhattan theater hangout Angus McIndoe. Riedel, who later admitted to being "tipsy," insulted Leveaux by claiming that English directors often ruin classic American musicals. While rumors circulated that Leveaux hit Riedel so hard that the columnist had to go to the emergency room, the truth is that Riedel was merely shoved to the floor and was not injured.

Cultural references
Riedel also appeared regularly on the "Imus in the Morning" program, "The Mark Simone Show", "The Mike Gallagher Show" and Fox News', "Red Eye".

Riedel played a version of himself in several episodes of the NBC musical drama Smash. In view of his notorious reputation as a theater columnist, Riedel was referred to as a "Napoleonic little Nazi" in the premiere episode of the on February 6, 2012. He later made cameo appearances in three episodes: 
"Hell on Earth" 
"The Fallout"
"The Nominations"

In 2016, Riedel appeared on John Mulaney and Nick Kroll's comedy show Oh, Hello on Broadway.

Riedel was mentioned in the opening song at the 71st Tony Awards performed by host Kevin Spacey.

See also
 New Yorkers in journalism

References

External links
 Michael Riedel's column at the New York Post

Living people
American columnists
American theater critics
Columbia College (New York) alumni
Place of birth missing (living people)
Journalists from New York City
New York Post people
New York (state) Republicans
American radio personalities
 
1966 births